Conus stupa is a species of sea snail, a marine gastropod mollusk in the family Conidae, the cone snails and their allies.

Like all species within the genus Conus, these snails are predatory and venomous. They are capable of "stinging" humans, therefore live ones should be handled carefully or not at all.

Description
The size of the shell varies between 43 mm and 100 mm.
Conus Stupa, members of the order Neogastropoda are mostly gonochoric and broadcast spawners. Their life cycle consists of embryos developing into planktonic trochophore larvae and later into juvenile veligers before becoming fully grown adults.

Distribution
This marine species occurs from Vietnam and the Philippines to Japan; off the Solomon Islands and the Loyalty Islands.

References

 Tucker J.K. & Tenorio M.J. (2009) Systematic classification of Recent and fossil conoidean gastropods. Hackenheim: Conchbooks. 296 pp.
 Monnier E., Limpalaër L., Robin A. & Roux C. (2018). A taxonomic iconography of living Conidae. Harxheim: ConchBooks. 2 vols. 1205 pp.page(s): 343
 Puillandre N., Duda T.F., Meyer C., Olivera B.M. & Bouchet P. (2015). One, four or 100 genera? A new classification of the cone snails. Journal of Molluscan Studies. 81: 1–23

External links
 The Conus Biodiversity website
 Cone Shells – Knights of the Sea
 

stupa
Gastropods described in 1956